Linguaphone is a global language training provider based in London that has provided self-study language courses since 1901.

Methodology
Linguaphone’s self-study courses follow Linguaphone's in-house methodology of “Listen, Understand, Speak.”  Students are encouraged to listen to the language from the beginning, to begin to read as they listen, and only to speak once they have learned to understand the language presented.

History

Linguaphone was established in 1901 by Jacques Roston, a translator and language teacher, born in Poland, (Koło), and they were the first language training company to recognise the potential of combining the traditional written course with the wax cylinder and later with records.

At the height of their popularity, Linguaphone was not only a large, international publishing house with many prestigious representative offices (for books, records, tapes and cassettes) but they also ran fashionable language schools in a number of major cities across the world, such as London, Paris, New York and Tokyo. This chain of Linguaphone Institutes could claim to be the second oldest among the international language teaching establishments (the oldest being Berlitz, founded in 1878 and known today as Berlitz International, with the controversial  Berlitz method) and, as such, Linguaphone had, at one time, the privilege of being an almost automatic first choice among the famous of the day, including royalty.

The schools that mainly catered for the business world and the diplomatic service, adapted the Linguaphone method to be used flexibly in combination with face-to-face tuition and the then new language laboratory. The tape recorders in these school language laboratories were specially designed (and patented) by Linguaphone to work on two separate tracks: a master track with the teachers' voices that could only be listened to but not erased, and another track for the students, where (in the gaps provided for the purpose) the students could record and erase their own voices as often as they liked or thought necessary. Teachers were also present to monitor the students’ progress during these laboratory sessions and, when needed, they could give individual guidance through their headphones that were linked to a central monitoring tower in the middle of the laboratory.

A further adaptation of this school method was then developed with the invention of the portable language laboratory, the so-called minilab, that could be rented for set periods (with cassettes instead of reel-to-reel tapes). The minilabs became widely used for in-company language tuition as well as for regular language training at government departments and professional organisations, such as the Ministry of Defence, the Foreign and Commonwealth Office and the Institute of Directors.

Economic pressures, not least the ever-increasing competition, however, forced the fashionable Linguaphone schools (with their luxurious premises and individual, face-to-face tuition) out of business. The last one (with its own Executives’ Club licensed to sell alcoholic drinks to members and their guests, even at hours when ordinary British catering establishments were strictly forbidden to do so) at 26–32 Oxford Street, London W.1. UK, closed in September 1980. Its demise also marked the end of an era in professional language teaching, for it had been the last of its kind to employ a core staff of salaried tutors with no time limit on their contracts, rather than just self-employed freelancers paid by the hour.

Linguaphone Hong Kong

Linguaphone's Hong Kong branch was opened in 1961, it gained much popularity during the 1970s and 1980s because its recording system gave a flexible option to those who could not attend language courses at a fixed time and location. It also allowed students to listen to the material repeatedly at any time they preferred during the course, which conventional education methods could not offer at the time in Hong Kong. However, with the advent of the Internet and popularization of computers, which facilitate an online and interactive learning experience, and other rivals such as Wall Street Institute Hong Kong, Linguaphone's Hong Kong branch suffered a steady decline since the early 2000s and eventually announced its liquidation on 17 January 2009.

Linguaphone Group English language training centers
The Linguaphone Group had a global network of English language training centers for adults (Direct English) and children (Pingu) worldwide across Europe, the Middle East, Asia and Africa. The Group had centers in Japan, France, Spain, Italy, Cyprus, Algeria, Egypt, Syria, Saudi Arabia, Malaysia, Singapore, Indonesia, Taiwan, Thailand, Turkey, Portugal, India and Vietnam.

Employee Unions
In the Japanese branch of Linguaphone, employees are represented by the union Tozen.

See also
 Language education

References

Further reading
 Linguaphone: 78 r.p.m. Records : Discography, by Eddie Shaw. London : E. & E. Shaw, 1999.
 Spoken, Broken and Bloody English: The Story of George Bernard Shaw, Linguaphone and Eliza Doolittle, by Jan Marsh. Foreword by Lord Quirk. Linguaphone Institute, 2002. 96pp. ISBN 0747309493.

External links
Linguaphone recordings from the British Library Sound Archive
Linguaphone Group website
Our Heritage

Language education publishing companies
Language schools
Second-language acquisition
Language-teaching methodology